South Chesapeake City Historic District is a national historic district at Chesapeake City, Cecil County, Maryland, United States. It reflects the town's period of greatest prosperity in the mid 19th century when the adjacent Chesapeake and Delaware Canal was an active commercial artery between major east coast waterways. Buildings from the 19th century dominate those few of the early 20th century and those of recent vintage.

It was added to the National Register of Historic Places in 1974.

References

External links
, including photo from 1974, at Maryland Historical Trust
Boundary Map of the South Chesapeake City Historic District, Carroll County, at Maryland Historical Trust

Chesapeake City, Maryland
Historic districts in Cecil County, Maryland
Historic districts on the National Register of Historic Places in Maryland
National Register of Historic Places in Cecil County, Maryland
1974 establishments in Maryland